Nemocón is a municipality and town of Colombia in the Central Savanna Province, part of the department of Cundinamarca. Nemocón, famous for its salt mine, was an important village in the Muisca Confederation, the country in the central Colombian Andes before the arrival of the Spanish. Nemocón is the northeasternmost municipality of the Metropolitan Area of Bogotá and the Bogotá River originates close to Nemocón. The median temperature of Nemocón is 12.8 °C. The municipality borders Tausa in the north, Suesca and Gachancipá in the east, Tocancipá and Zipaquirá in the south and in the west the rivers Checua and Neusa and the municipality of Cogua.

Etymology 
Nemocón is derived from Enemocón and means "The cry or sadness of the warrior" in the Chibcha language. Another etymology is that the town is named after zipa Nemequene.

History

Prehistory 
Archaeological evidence surfaced by Gonzalo Correal Urrego in 1979 and Ana María Groot in 1992 has shown that Nemocón was inhabited early in the history of inhabitation of the Altiplano Cundiboyacense. One of the oldest evidence of human settlement; lithic scraper tools, bone tools and the remains of food of the hunter-gatherers (deer, foxes, jaguars and rodents) has been dated at 7640 BP. The inhabitants of the area lived under rock shelters, similar to Tequendama.

Herrera Period

Checua 

First researcher of Checua was Colombian anthropologist and archaeologist Ana María Groot. In later years other archaeological sites have been found. Rock art has been discovered at various sites in Nemocón, among others at the border with Suesca.

This lithic period, part of the Andean preceramic, predates the Herrera Period of which archaeological evidence has been found by Marianne Cardale de Schrimpff in 1975, 1976 and the 1980s. Remains of deer, guinea pigs, rabbits, pecaris, howler monkeys and armadillos have been discovered in Nemocón and formed an important part of the diet of the people. Ceramics of Nemocón date to the 4th century BC and showed that Nemocón in those ages was already important in the extraction of salt. Excavations in Nemocón also have revealed the use of needles.

Muisca 
The Herrera Period was followed by the culturally advanced civilisation of the Muisca, organised in their loose Muisca Confederation. The Muisca Period typically commenced in 800 AD and the people were named Pueblo de la Sal; "Salt People" because of their trading in the product. Ceramics of this period found in Nemocón originated from farther away on the Altiplano and ceramics of Nemocón and Zipaquirá found elsewhere on the Bogotá savanna are related to the salt trade. Of the central Colombian indigenous peoples, only the Lache and U'wa were the other miners of salt. The Muisca exploited halite in various locations in their territories, among others in Nemocón, Zipaquirá, Sesquilé, Tausa, Gámeza, and Guachetá. Nemocón was a market town where the salt was traded. A smaller salt mine was located in Sopó. Early evidence of salt extraction dates back to the end of the first millennium BC.

The Muisca women extracted the salt from a brine in large pots. According to chronicler Juan de Santa Gertrudis, used the mineral to dry and preserve their fish and meat.

Colonial period 
During the Spanish colonial period, the salt was exploited by hand labour of the surviving Muisca.

Modern Nemocón was founded on July 26, 1600 by Luis Henríquez. As of 1614, wheat was successfully cultivated in Nemocón.

Nemocón today 
In modern times the extraction of salt continued and the economical activity of the town has expanded to the cultivation of flowers and the extraction of kaolin.

Tourism 
Famous for its salt mine and museum, Nemocón is a touristic village and linked by train from Bogotá. The salt mine is the second-largest of Colombia, after the Salt Cathedral in neighbouring Zipaquirá. Sunday is market day in Nemocón.

Ferias 
 Festival del floricultor
 September: Festival de Danzas
 December: Festival del macramé and Christmas lighting

Born in Nemocón 
 Ricardo Moros Urbina, Painter s.XIX. Founder Colombian History Academy.
 Miguel Gutiérrez Nieto, Bogotá´s National Prefect and Major under Mosquera's presidency, S. XIX
 Eustacio Sanz de Santamaría, Foreign Affairs Secretary under Holguín's presidency. Diplomatic and writer
 Felipa Molina Morales and Antonio de Luna, Commoners revolution indigenous leaders.
 Luis Antonio Orjuela Quintero, Historian,. academic, educator.
 Manuel Medardo Espinosa, romantic poet.
 Julio Rubiano, former professional cyclist

Trivia 
 Remains of a mastodont have been found in Nemocón.
 Scenes of the movie The 33 were filmed in the salt mine of Nemocón.
 The second leg of The Amazing Race 32 featured the salt mine of Nemocón and the Templo Parroquial San Francisco de Asís.

Gallery

See also 

Muisca salt mining
Zipaquirá, Tausa, Muisca women, Nemequene

References

Bibliography

External links 

  Salt mine of Nemocón - official website
 Video of Nemocón

Municipalities of Cundinamarca Department
Populated places established in 1600
1600 establishments in the Spanish Empire
Tourist attractions near Bogotá
Buildings and structures in Cundinamarca Department
Tourist attractions in Cundinamarca Department
Salt museums
Salt mines in Colombia
Muisca Confederation
Checua
Muysccubun
Checua